Leopold I of Austria may refer to:

Leopold I of Austria (Babenberg), (d. 994), Margrave of Austria of the house of Babenberg
Leopold I of Austria (Habsburg), (1290–1326), Duke of Austria of the house of Habsburg

See also
Leopold I (disambiguation)
List of rulers of Austria
Habsburg